Phir Milenge (We Will Meet Again) is a 1942 Indian Hindi and Urdu-language social drama film produced and directed by Sohrab Modi. Made under the banner of Minerva Movietone, it had music by Mir Saheb while the lyricist was Pandit Sudarshan. Modi had discovered Meena when she came to watch his film shooting. He cast her in a character role for her debut in Sikandar (1941). This was her second film for Modi where she played a supporting role. She was later to marry producer, director Roop K. Shorey and go on to become popular as Meena Shorey.

The film starred Sardar Akhtar, Sadiq Ali, K. N. Singh, Meena (Meena Shorey), Eruch Tarapore and Saadat Ali.

Cast
 Sardar Akhtar
 Sadiq Ali
 Meena Shorey
 K. N. Singh
 Eruch Tarapore
 Abu Bakar
 Ghulam Hussain
 Saadat Ali
 G. S. Shore

Soundtrack
The music was composed by Mir Sahib with lyrics by  Pandit Sudarshan. The singers were Sardar Akhtar, Menka, Meena Shorey, Abu Bakar, Sadiq Ali, G. S. Shore and E. Tarapore.

Song List

References

External links

1942 films
1940s Hindi-language films
1942 drama films
Indian drama films
Films directed by Sohrab Modi
Indian black-and-white films
Hindi-language drama films